Rudolph Herzog (born 1973, Munich) is a German film director, producer and writer.

Films
2022: Last Exit: Space, a documentary about colonizing space, director; 
2019: How to Fake a War, released at the Edinburgh International Film Festival, 
2011: BBC/ARD documentary on humour in Nazi Germany based on the book Dead Funny
2014:The President, coproducer,  a feature film about the last days of a dictator. 
Best Film at the Chicago Film Festival, the Audience Award for Best Film from the Tokyo FILMeX and the Beirut International Film Festival and the Golden Hooker Award at the Galway Film Fleadh;  
 2014: A Short History of Nuclear Folly; original German title: Die Atombombe im Vorgarten; 
 A documentary based on the book Der verstrahlte Westernheld translated as A Short History of Nuclear Folly
2010: Amundsen - Lost in the Arctic, a National Geographic documentary on polar explorer Roald Amundsen, writer, director
2008: Abora - Letzte Position Atlantik
The Agent,  about the Stasi double agent 
2006: Heil Hitler, das Schwein ist tot! - Humor unterm Hakenkreuz; 
 TV film about Holocaust humor
2007: UK release: Laughing with Hitler, narrator; 
2004: The White Diamond, documentary, screenplay by Rudolph Herzog; directed by Werner Herzog; 
2004: The Heist,  reality crime series, director

Books
2017: Truggestalten
A collection of seven supernatural stories
2019: Translation: Ghosts of Berlin 
2012: Der verstrahlte Westernheld und anderer Irrsinn aus dem Atomzeitalter ("The irradiated western hero and other madness from the nuclear age")
2014: Translation: A Short History of Nuclear Folly
2006: Heil Hitler, das Schwein ist tot! Lachen unter Hitler - Komik und Humor im Dritten Reich, 
2011: Translation: Dead Funny. Telling Jokes in Hitler's Germany (based on Laughing with Hitler)
Named Book of the Year by The Atlantic

References

External links

1973 births
Living people
German film directors
German writers